This is a list of earthquakes in 1958. Only magnitude 6.0 or greater earthquakes appear on the list. Lower magnitude events are included if they have caused death, injury or damage. Events that occurred in remote areas are excluded from the list unless they generated significant media interest. All dates are listed according to UTC time. Not the most active year with only 8 earthquakes reaching above magnitude 7.0. The largest event was a magnitude 8.3 earthquake in Russia in November, and another equally sized event in Alaska. Ecuador and Peru also saw fairly high activity. 1958 had only 368 deaths. Most of this total came from earthquakes in Iran and Ecuador.

Overall

By death toll 

 Note: At least 10 casualties

By magnitude 

 Note: At least 7.0 magnitude

Notable events

January

February

March

April

May

June

July

August

September

October

November

December

References

1958
 
1958